Avraham (Pachi) Shapira (1934 - ) is an Israeli  scholar of secular Jewish culture. He was a professor of Jewish History at Tel Aviv University and editor of the kibbutz movement journal Shdemot.

Biography
Avraham (Pachi) Shapira grew up in Haifa. He served in the Nahal brigade and eventually settled on Kibbutz Yizra'el where he had been stationed. He studied at Hebrew University of Jerusalem.Shapira was the co-editor of The Seventh Day: Soldiers' Talk About the Six-Day War with Amos Oz. He was one of the founders of a group of kibbutzniks who raised questions about Jewish and Israeli identity and their underlying values.

References

External links
Six Day War’s ‘Censored Voices’ come to NY, LA
 Israeli scholars
 Kibbutzniks
Academic staff of Tel Aviv University
Hebrew University of Jerusalem alumni